The Central District of Mahshahr County is a district (bakhsh) in Mahshahr County, Khuzestan Province, Iran. At the 2006 census, its population was 179,804, in 38,469 families.  The district has two cities: Bandar-e Mahshahr and Chamran. The district has one rural district (dehestan): Jarahi Rural District. 
Bandar-e Mahshahr is an ancient city and port in the Khuzestan province in south-western Iran. Originally known as Reyshahr and then Machuleh, it eventually came to be known as Bandar-e Ma'shoor. The name changed again in 1965, this time to Bandar-e Mah Shahr. The word Mah-shahr is Persian and means "city of the moon".

References 

https://web.archive.org/web/20180214014508/https://www.discoverworld.com/Iran/Khuzestan-Province/Bandar-e-Mahshahr

Mahshahr County
Districts of Khuzestan Province